The AENA Super Cup was the top level netball league featuring teams from England between 2001 and 2005. The league was organised by the All England Netball Association. Its main sponsor was Fisher & Paykel and, as a result, it was also known as the Fisher & Paykel Super Cup. It was also referred to as the Super League. London Tornadoes were the Super Cup's most successful team, winning three of the five seasons contested. Northern Thunder and Team Bath Force both won a title each. In 2005–06 it was replaced by the Netball Superleague.

Teams
The Super Cup featured six teams. The England national netball team's senior and development squads were shared around, and each side was initially allowed to import up to three foreigners.
 Following the demise of the Super Cup, four of the six teams subsequently went onto to play in the Netball Superleague.

Notes
  London Tornadoes were also known as Petchey London Tornadoes.

Finals

Winners

References

     
Netball Superleague
Netball competitions in England
Sports leagues established in 2001
Sports leagues disestablished in 2005
2001 establishments in England
2005 disestablishments in England
England
netball
netball